Joseph Femi Olatubosun (born December 21, 1990, in Kawo, Kaduna State) is a Nigerian footballer.

Career
Olatubosun began his career with Pepsi Football Academy and joined on 6 November 2008 to Liberty Professionals F.C. He left Liberty Professionals F.C. on 21 February 2009 and signed with Girabola Club Caála. In January 2010 he was sold by Liberty Professionals.

International career
He is a former member of the Nigeria national under-17 football team and represented the team in an 8 Nations Tournament in South Korea.

References

1990 births
Living people
Yoruba sportspeople
Nigerian footballers
Nigerian expatriate footballers
Expatriate footballers in Ghana
Académica Petróleos do Lobito players
C.R. Caála players
G.D. Sagrada Esperança players
Girabola players
Pepsi Football Academy players
Liberty Professionals F.C. players
Ayia Napa FC players
Expatriate footballers in Angola
Expatriate footballers in Cyprus
Association football midfielders